The R665 road is a regional road in Ireland. The route runs from Mitchelstown to Clonmel via Ballyporeen, Clogheen and Ardfinnan, passing through parts of counties Cork, Tipperary and Waterford. The R665 was once a key part of the historic route from Dublin to Cork and was mapped as such as late as 1778. A turnpike road, it was also a key part of the route linking Mallow with Dublin, via today's N73.

See also
Roads in Ireland
Motorways in Ireland
National secondary road
Trunk Roads in Ireland
History of roads in Ireland

References

Roads Act 1993 (Classification of Regional Roads) Order 2006 – Department of Transport

Regional roads in the Republic of Ireland
Roads in County Cork
Roads in County Tipperary
Roads in County Waterford